Kapp Hansteen is a headland at the northwestern side of Nordaustlandet, Svalbard. The headland is named after astronomer Christopher Hansteen. It is located at the northern part of the peninsula Botniahalvøya, between Brennevinsfjorden and Lady Franklinfjorden.

References

Headlands of Nordaustlandet